Alan Philpott (8 November 1942 – 26 May 2009) was an English footballer who played in the Football League for Oldham Athletic and Stoke City.

Career
Philpott was born in Stoke-on-Trent and joined Stoke City's youth ranks in 1960. He made his debut for the "Potters" on the final day of the 1960–61 season against Liverpool at the Victoria Ground. He was a regular in the reserves and in the first team he played twice in 1961–62 and once in 1962–63, but failed to make an appearance in 1963–64. He showed useful versatility in 1964–65 where he played 17 games in a number of positions, scoring once against Nottingham Forest. Philpott made three appearances in 1965–66, scoring in a League Cup match against Chesterfield. 

He broke into the first team in 1966–67, making 27 appearances but found himself back in the reserves in 1967–68 and was sold to Oldham Athletic by Tony Waddington. He joined up with a number of former Stoke players at Boundary Park including manager Jimmy McIlroy, and over two seasons he made 33 appearances, scoring once in his second-to-last game against Barrow. He returned to Staffordshire and played for non-league Stafford Rangers and Eastwood Hanley before having a spell as youth coach at Port Vale. He later became a cricket umpire in North Staffordshire and was umpiring a game when he suffered a fatal heart attack on 26 May 2009.

Career statistics

References

1942 births
2009 deaths
Footballers from Stoke-on-Trent
Association football midfielders
English footballers
Stoke City F.C. players
Oldham Athletic A.F.C. players
Stafford Rangers F.C. players
Eastwood Hanley F.C. players
English Football League players